Ţara was a magazine from the Republic of Moldova founded on August 15, 1990 as a newspaper of the Popular Front of Moldova. Ţara was the successor of Deşteptarea. Ştefan Secăreanu was the editor in chief and Sergiu Burcă was the deputy editor in chief (1990–1994).

Bibliography
 Partidul Popular Creştin Democrat. Documente şi materiale. 1998–2008. Volumul I (1988–1994).

References

External links 
 Ne scuturaseram de frica. Interviu cu Sergiu Burcă, Presedinte al Asociatiei Euro–Atlantice din Moldova
 Istoric
 Republica Moldova, cronologie
 Partidul Popular Creştin Democrat a imortalizat în timp activitatea sa de 20 de ani

Literary magazines published in Moldova
Magazines established in 1990
Magazines disestablished in 2003
Romanian-language magazines
Popular Front of Moldova
1990 establishments in the Moldavian Soviet Socialist Republic
2003 disestablishments in Moldova
Defunct literary magazines published in Europe